Nelson Cook (1808–1892) was an American portraitist and "occasional poet".

Biography
Cook was born in Malta, New York in 1808, one of nine children of furniture maker Joseph Cook and Mary Ann Tolman, originally from Wallingford, Connecticut.  He moved to Toronto Canada around 1830, where he worked as an agent for his brother Ransom and took up painting.  He returned to New York in 1840 and settled in Saratoga Springs.

Cook was a self-taught artist and painted over 100 portraits, including many prominent people from Canada, Saratoga Springs and elsewhere.  Much of his work is in private collections.

Nelson Cook was married to Esther Freeman and had one daughter, Marion, born in Canada.

He died in Saratoga Springs in 1892 and is believed to be buried in Greenridge Cemetery.

See also
Ransom Cook

References

External links
 Nelson Cook: American Portraitist (1808-1892)
 Victorian Artists: Nelson Cook
American paintings & historical prints from the Middendorf collection, an exhibition catalog from The Metropolitan Museum of Art (fully available online as PDF), which contains material on Cook (no. 25)

American male poets
American poets
American portrait painters
People from Malta, New York
Burials at Greenridge Cemetery
1808 births
1892 deaths
Occasional poets